The AFF U-16 Women's Championship is association football tournament for women's national teams under the age of 15.  It was first conducted in 2009 as the AFF U-16 Women's Championship with an upper age limit of 16. It is organised by the ASEAN Football Federation every two years. The official tournament started in 2009, hosted by Myanmar and won by Australia.

History

2009
The first women's ASEAN championship at the youth level, held as the 2009 AFF U-16 Women's Championship was held in Myanmar from 9 October through 18 October 2009. The competition was held at the Thuwunna Stadium and Aung San Stadium.

In the final, Australia defeated Thailand by 8–0.

2017
The second women's ASEAN championship at the youth level, held as the 2017 AFF U-16 Girls' Championship was held in Laos from 8 May through 20 May 2017. The competition was held at the New Laos National Stadium.

In the final, Thailand defeated Philippines by 6–2.

Results

Records and statistics

Total wins

Participating nations 

Legend

  — Champions
  — Runners-up
  — Third place
  — Fourth place

 GS — Group stage
 q — Qualified for the current tournament
  — Did not enter / Withdrew / Banned
  — Hosts

General Statistics
As per statistical convention in football, matches decided in extra time are counted as wins and losses, while matches decided by penalty shoot-outs are counted as draws. 3 points per win, 1 point per draw and 0 points per loss.

As end of 2019 AFF U-16 Women's Championship

Awards

Winning coaches

See also 
 AFF Women's Championship
 AFF U-19 Women's Championship

References

External links 
 at the ASEAN Football Federation

 

AFF competitions
Youth football competitions
Recurring sporting events established in 2009
Women's association football competitions in Asia
2009 establishments in Southeast Asia